Bruère-Allichamps is a commune in the Cher department, Centre-Val de Loire, France.

Geography
The A71 autoroute runs through the northern part of the commune’s territory. The village is one of seven places claiming to be the geographical centre of France (excluding Corsica and Overseas France).

Population

Sights

 The abbey of Noirlac, dating from the twelfth century.
 A stone marking the village as the geographic centre of France.
 The twelfth century priory church of Saint-Étienne.
 The Château de Châteaufer, built in 1670.

See also
Communes of the Cher department

References

External links

The abbey website 

Communes of Cher (department)